Opacoptera is a genus of moth in the family Lecithoceridae.

Species
 Opacoptera callirrhabda (Meyrick, 1936)
 Opacoptera ecbasta Wu, 1996
 Opacoptera flavicana Wu & Liu, 1992

References

Natural History Museum Lepidoptera genus database

Lecithoceridae